Events from the year 1969 in Scotland.

Incumbents 

 Secretary of State for Scotland and Keeper of the Great Seal – Willie Ross

Law officers 
 Lord Advocate – Henry Wilson
 Solicitor General for Scotland – Ewan Stewart

Judiciary 
 Lord President of the Court of Session and Lord Justice General – Lord Clyde
 Lord Justice Clerk – Lord Grant
 Chairman of the Scottish Land Court – Lord Birsay

Events 
 6 January – closure of the Waverley Line (the Edinburgh–Galashiels–Hawick–Carlisle railway) and The St. Andrews Railway (the branch line from Leuchars).
 8 February – unusual aurora borealis seen over Scotland.
 17 March – the Longhope life-boat in Orkney is lost; the entire crew of 8 dies.
 27 March – first ordination of a woman in the Church of Scotland, Catherine McConnachie by the Presbytery of Aberdeen.
 28 April – Gordon Gray, Archbishop of St Andrews and Edinburgh, is elevated to cardinal of the Catholic Church; the first resident cardinal in Scotland for almost 400 years.
 9 May – formation in Glasgow of the Scottish Minorities Group to campaign for the decriminalisation of gay sexual practices in Scotland.
 17 May – Scotland beats Cyprus 8–0 in a World Cup Qualifier at Hampden Park.
 May – Ross Pit at Brora is closed by a fire.
 1 July – John Lennon, Yoko Ono and their children are hospitalised at Golspie following a car accident while on holiday.
 September – the Royal Commission on Local Government in Scotland (chaired by Lord Wheatley) reports, recommending a major reorganisation of local government in Scotland substantially as carried out in 1975 under terms of the Local Government (Scotland) Act 1973.
 9 October – Backwater Reservoir opened to supply the Dundee area.
 30 October – Glasgow Gorbals by-election: Labour retains the seat but the SNP takes second place from the Conservatives.
 30 December – the Linwood bank robbery occurs in Linwood, Renfrewshire and three police officers are shot in the aftermath, two fatally.
 The policies of Culzean Castle become Scotland's first country park.

Births 
 1 January
 Paul Lawrie, golfer and journalist
 Tom Urie, actor
 13 January – Stephen Hendry, snooker player
 6 March – Neil Findlay, Labour Party Member of the Scottish Parliament
 28 March – Laurie Brett, actress
 April – Kenny Alexander, businessman
 24 April
 Donna Robertson, judoka and wrestler
 Fiona Robertson, judoka and wrestler
 Eilidh Whiteford, Scottish National Party Member of Parliament
 11 August – Ashley Jensen, actress
 25 August – Catriona Matthew, golfer
 28 September – Angus Robertson, Scottish National Party Member of Parliament
 13 November – Gerard Butler, actor
 5 December – Lynne Ramsay film director, writer, producer, and cinematographer best known for the films Ratcatcher, Morvern Callar and We Need to Talk about Kevin
 7 December – James Murray, boxer (died 1995)
 18 December – Irvin Duguid, keyboard player (Stiltskin)
 24 December – Mark Millar, comic book writer
 31 December – Dominik Diamond, presenter and newspaper columnist

Deaths 
 10 May – John Bannerman, Baron Bannerman of Kildonan, international rugby player and Liberal politician (born 1901)
 7 September – Gavin Maxwell, naturalist and author (born 1914)
 6 December – Florence Horsbrugh, Baroness Horsbrugh, Scottish Unionist Party and Conservative Party politician (born 1889)

The arts
 George Mackay Brown's short stories A Time to Keep and collected writings An Orkney Tapestry are published.
 Jenny Gilbertson's documentary film Shetland Pony is made.
 Tom Leonard's Six Glasgow Poems are published.
 The cultural magazine New Edinburgh Review begins publication.
 Antonia Fraser's biography Mary Queen of Scots is published.

See also 
 1969 in Northern Ireland

References 

 
Scotland
Years of the 20th century in Scotland
1960s in Scotland